Cyperus rufostriatus is a species of sedge that is native to eastern parts of the Madagascar.

See also 
 List of Cyperus species

References 

rufostriatus
Plants described in 1919
Endemic flora of Madagascar
Taxa named by Henri Chermezon